Hornado is roast pig, cooked whole, in Ecuadorian cuisine. It is often served in highland markets. Hornado is generally accompanied by llapingacho, mote (hominy), and vegetables.

See also
 List of Ecuadorian dishes and foods

External links
Photo of typical plate of hornado

Ecuadorian cuisine
Pork